Northeastern College may refer to:
Northeastern College, Santiago, Isabela, Philippines
North Eastern College, Sangre Grande, Trinidad, Trinidad and Tobago

See also
Northeastern University (disambiguation)